Axonolaimidae is a family of nematodes belonging to the order Araeolaimida.

Genera

Genera:
 Aequalodontium Smolyanko & Belogurov, 1993 
 Alaimonema
 Anplostoma

References

Nematodes